Robert Donald Walker (June 18, 1888 – March 4, 1954) was an American film actor. He appeared in more than 200 films between 1913 and 1953. He was born in Bethlehem, Pennsylvania and died in Los Angeles.

Selected filmography

 The Vampire's Trail (1914)
 Don Caesar de Bazan (1915) - Charles II of Spain
 The Way Back (1915) - Ralph Kingman
 The Ploughshare (1915) - Jack Strong, Jenny's brother
 Children of Eve (1915) – Bert Madison
 Caprice of the Mountains (1916) – Dick Deane
 The Light of Happiness (1916) – Reverend Clyde Harmon
 The Gates of Eden (1916) – William Bard
 The Cossack Whip (1916) – Alexis
 A Wife by Proxy (1917) – Norton Burbeck
 The Mortal Sin (1917) – George Anderson
 God's Law and Man's (1917) – Dr. Claude Drummond
 Lady Barnacle (1917) – George Morling
 Aladdin’s Other Lamp (1917) – Harry Hardy
 The Girl Without A Soul (1917) – Hiram Miller
 Blue Jeans (1917) – Perry Bascom
 The Woman Between Friends (1918) – Jack Graylock
 At the Mercy of Men (1918) – Count Andreas
 The Fair Pretender (1918) – Harcourt
 The Whirlpool (1918) – Richard Brettner
 Miss Innocence (1918) – Henry Grant / Lawrence Grant
 The Woman Who Gave (1918) – Don Walcott
 The Sins of the Children (1918) – Graham Guthrie
 The Light (1919) – Etienne Desechette
 Burglar by Proxy (1919) – Harlan Graves
 The Merry-Go-Round (1919) – Charles Merryweather
 The Double Hold-Up (1919, Short) – Wade
 The Lion Man (1919, Serial) – John Cavendish
 Rouge and Riches (1920) – Jefferson Summers
 Shore Acres (1920) – Sam Warren
 The Woman in His House (1920) – Associate Doctor
 The Texan (1920) – Winthrop Endicott
 Isobel or The Trail's End (1920) – Pvt. Thomas Pelliter
 Prairie Trails (1920) – Winthrop Adams Endicott
 White Oak (1921) – Barbara's Brother
 Reckless Chances (1922) – Harry Allen
 Broad Daylight (1922) – The Scarab
 The Drug Traffic (1923) – Willie Shade
 Itching Palms (1923) – Dr. Peak
 Why Women Remarry (1923) – Dan Hannon's sister's second husband
 The Dancing Cheat (1924) – Bobby Norton
 Battling Brewster (1924) – George Wendell
 The Rip Snorter (1925) – Robert Willis
 The Riding Comet (1925) – Austin Livingston
 The Mystery Box (1925) – George Mason
 The Drug Store Cowboy (1925) – Gentleman Jack
 Billy the Kid (1925)
 The Outlaw's Daughter (1925) – Slim Cole
 Dangerous Fists (1925)
 Warrior Gap (1925) – Maj. Burleigh
 Tonio, Son of the Sierras (1925) – Lt. Booth
 A Daughter of the Sioux (1925) – Eagle Wing
 Law or Loyalty (1926) – Davis French
 Deuce High (1926) – Ranger McLeod
 The Silent Flyer (1926) – Henchman
 The Gallant Fool (1926) – Captain Turgemore
 Western Courage (1927) – Stephen Stanton
 Daring Deeds (1927) – Walter Sarles
 Roaring Fires (1927)
 The Cowboy Cavalier (1928)
 The Mysterious Airman (1928) – William Craft
 The Upland Rider (1928) – Bernt
 The Code of the Scarlet (1928) – Frank Morgan
 The Dream Melody (1929) – George Monroe
 The Voice from the Sky (1929) – Edgar Ballin
 Bar-L Ranch (1930) – Henchman
 The Fighting Legion (1930) – Ranger Tom Dawson
 Ridin' Law (1930) – Frank
 Canyon Hawks (1930) – Steve aka The Hawk
 The Phantom of the Desert (1930) – Steve – Henchman
 Breed of the West (1930) – Longrope Wheeler – Crooked Foreman
 Westward Bound (1930) – Steve – Henchman
 Little Caesar (1931) – Lorch Henchman (uncredited)
 West of Cheyenne (1931) – Henchman Nevada
 The Mystery Trooper (1931, Serial) – Mountie Sergeant (uncredited)
 Pueblo Terror (1931) – Bob Morgan
 Trapped (1931) – Policeman (uncredited)
 The Sign of the Wolf (1931, Serial) – Joe – Henchman
 The Kid from Arizona (1931) -The Crooked Foreman / Gang Leader
 The Vanishing Legion (1931) – Oil Co. Director Allen
 Headin' for Trouble (1931) – Butch Morgan – Henchman
 The Sunset Trail (1932) – Henchman (uncredited)
 The Lone Trail (1932) – Joe
 Hell Fire Austin (1932) – Soldier / Henchman (uncredited)
 The Man from New Mexico (1932) – Mort Snyder
 Border Devils (1932) – Cowhand (uncredited)
 The Scarlet Brand (1932) – Bill Morse
 Dynamite Ranch (1932) – Henchman (uncredited)
 Come On, Tarzan (1932) – Cowhand (uncredited)
 Between Fighting Men (1932) – Man Who Reports Murder (uncredited)
 The Devil Horse (1932, Serial) – Saunders [Ch. 6] (uncredited)
 Tombstone Canyon (1932) – Skeeter (uncredited)
 Phantom Thunderbolt (1933) – Henchman (uncredited)
 The Lone Avenger (1933) – Wounded Man (uncredited)
 King of the Arena (1933) – Deputy Bob (uncredited)
 The Fiddlin' Buckaroo (1933) – Deputy Harry (uncredited)
 The Trail Drive (1933) – Cattle-Buyer (uncredited)
 Strawberry Roan (1933) – Bat
 Twin Husbands (1933) – Burglar (uncredited)
 Jaws of Justice (1933) – Boone Jackson
 Sagebrush Trail (1933) – Henchman (uncredited)
 The Pecos Dandy (1934) – Unknown Role
 The Border Menace (1934) – Henchman (uncredited)
 I Believed in You (1934) – Detective (uncredited)
 Mystery Ranch (1934) – Deputy (uncredited)
 Monte Carlo Nights (1934) – Detective (uncredited)
 Rawhide Mail (1934) – Brown – the Buyer
 Rocky Rhodes (1934) – Deputy Mike (uncredited)
 Thunder Over Texas (1934) – Crooked Deputy Jenks (uncredited)
 The Prescott Kid (1934) – Deputy (uncredited)
 Terror of the Plains (1934) – Sheriff
 Mystery Mountain (1934, Serial) – Henchman (uncredited)
 Loser's End (1935)
 Million Dollar Haul (1935)
 Rough Riding Ranger (1935)
 Captured in Chinatown (1935)
 Midnight Phantom (1935)
 The Speed Reporter (1936)
 Hair-Trigger Casey (1936)
 Caryl of the Mountains (1936)
 Gunsmoke Ranch (1937)
 The Mysterious Pilot (1937, Serial)
 Two-Fisted Sheriff (1937)
 El Diablo Rides (1939)
 Pioneer Days (1940)
 I'll Sell My Life (1941)

References

External links

Bob Walker at TCMDb

1888 births
1954 deaths
American male film actors
American male silent film actors
Male actors from Pennsylvania
People from Bethlehem, Pennsylvania
20th-century American male actors
Male Western (genre) film actors